Blinov, or Blinova (feminine; Блинова), is a Russian surname, derived from the word "блин" (pancake). Notable people with the surname include:

 Aleksandr Blinov (equestrian) (1954–2021), Soviet equestrian and Olympic champion
 Aleksandr Blinov (sport shooter) (b. 1981), Russian sport shooter
 Alexei Blinov (b. 1964), electronic engineer and new media artist
 Fyodor Blinov (1827–1902), Russian inventor
 Pyotr Blinov (1913–1942), Soviet  Udmurt  writer  and journalist
 Viktor Blinov (1945–1968), Soviet ice hockey player
 Yury Blinov (b. 1949), Soviet ice hockey player

Russian-language surnames